Harold Solomon was the defending champion, but did not participate this year.

Mel Purcell won the tournament, beating Per Hjertquist in the final, 6–1, 6–1.

Seeds

  Mel Purcell (champion)
  Shlomo Glickstein (quarterfinals)
  Vincent Van Patten (quarterfinals)
  Ilie Năstase (second round)
  Per Hjertquist (final)
  Steve Krulevitz (semifinals)
  Matt Doyle (first round)
  Klaus Eberhard (semifinals)

Draw

Finals

Top half

Bottom half

External links
 Main draw

Tel Aviv Open
1981 Grand Prix (tennis)